The Pelloux I government of Italy held office from 29 June 1898 until 14 May 1899, a total of 319 days, or 1 year and 15 days.

Government parties
The government was composed by the following parties:

Composition

References

Italian governments
1898 establishments in Italy